Wolverine Lake may refer to:

Wolverine Lake (Cochrane District), a lake in Ontario, Canada
Wolverine Lake, Michigan, a community in Michigan, United States